is a set of waterfalls near downtown Kobe, Japan, with an important significance in Japanese literature and Japanese art. In Japan, Nunobiki is considered one of the greatest "divine falls" together with Kegon Falls and Nachi Falls.

Nunobiki waterfalls comprises four separate falls: Ontaki, Mentaki, Tsutsumigadaki, and Meotodaki.

Tales of Ise
A well-known section of the Tales of Ise describes a trip taken by a minor official and his guests to Nunobiki Falls. They begin a poetry-writing contest, to which one of the guests, a commander of the guards, contributes:

Which, I wonder, is higher-
This waterfall or the fall of my tears
As I wait in vain,
Hoping today or tomorrow
To rise in the world.

The minor official offers his own composition:

It looks as though someone
Must be unstringing
Those clear cascading gems.
Alas! My sleeves are too narrow
To hold them all.

Notes

References
 Art & Artifice: Japanese Photographs of the Meiji Era – Selections from the Jean S. and Frederic A. Sharf Collection at the Museum of Fine Arts, Boston, with essays by Sebastian Dobson, Anne Nishimura Morse, and Frederic A. Sharf (Boston: MFA Publications, 2004), 42.
 Hometown Homepage; 'Nunobiki Waterfalls, an Oasis in the City'. Accessed 11 April 2006.
 Morse, Anne Nishimura. 'Souvenirs of "Old Japan": Meiji-Era Photography and the Meisho Tradition'. In Art & Artifice: Japanese Photographs of the Meiji Era – Selections from the Jean S. and Frederic A. Sharf Collection at the Museum of Fine Arts, Boston (Boston: MFA Publications, 2004).
 The New York Public Library, s.v. "Nunobiki". Accessed 11 April 2006.
 David Farrah, Michio Nakano, The Poems of Nunobiki Falls (『布引の滝のうた 詩歌・和歌・俳句』), Shinbisha (審美社), November 1998, in Japanese charters, Roma-ji (Romanized form), and their English translations,

External links 

Nunobiki Falls (Kobe Convention & Visitors Association)
One Hundred Scenes of Kobe: 27. Nunobiki Waterfalls (City of Kobe)
Kobe Nunobiki Herb Gardens & Ropeway (Kobe Convention & Visitors Association)
Kobe Jewelry Box: Kobe Nunobiki Herb Gardens & Ropeway (Kobe Convention & Visitors Association)

Tales
These are tales about the falls collected by Kobe City:
Sarasvati of Nunobiki Waterfall
Ariwara no Yukihira, Ariwara no Narihira and Nunobiki Waterfall
En-no-Gyoja and Nunobiki Waterfall
Mysterious Palace at the Bottom of the Waterfall Basin

Waterfalls of Japan
Geography of Kobe
Japanese literature
Tourist attractions in Kobe
Landforms of Hyōgo Prefecture